Ajit Singh (born 2 March 1952) is an Indian field hockey player. He competed in the men's tournament at the 1976 Summer Olympics.

Ajit Singh is the brother of Harmik Singh, and the father of later Indian international Gagan Ajit Singh.

References

External links
 

1952 births
Living people
Indian male field hockey players
Olympic field hockey players of India
Field hockey players at the 1976 Summer Olympics
Place of birth missing (living people)
Asian Games medalists in field hockey
Asian Games silver medalists for India
Medalists at the 1974 Asian Games
Field hockey players at the 1974 Asian Games